High Pressure is a 1932 American pre-Code comedy film directed by Mervyn LeRoy and starring William Powell and Evelyn Brent. It is based on the play Hot Money by Aben Kandel. The film is preserved at the Library of Congress and in the Warner Archive.

Plot
Gar Evans (William Powell) agrees to promote Ginsburg's product, artificial rubber created from sewage, only after his friend Mike Donahey (Frank McHugh) assures him it is not a scam. Gar is superstitious; he believes he will only succeed if his long-suffering girlfriend Francine Dale (Evelyn Brent) joins them on the venture. She, however, has given up on him, especially since he left her five days before to pick up something, and never came back. It is only with great effort that he convinces her to give him another chance.

Gar quickly incorporates the "Golden Gate Artificial Rubber Company", rents a whole floor of a building, installs old crony Clifford Gray (Guy Kibbee) as president, gives Helen Wilson (Evalyn Knapp) a job as a secretary, and hires a lot of high-pressure salesmen to sell shares. As news spreads, natural rubber company stock prices start to fall, and Mr. Banks (Charles Middleton) offers to buy the company on behalf of the established rubber firms, but the bid is too low for Gar. Banks then threatens to get an injunction preventing sales of Gar's shares pending an investigation. Gar welcomes it.

However, Ginsburg (promoted to "Colonel" by Gar), has misplaced the inventor of the process, Dr. Rudolph Pfeiffer (Harry Beresford). When he is finally located and set to work making a sample, Gar invites scientists to inspect the finished product, only to discover that Pfeiffer is a deranged crackpot (his next invention involves hens laying pre-decorated Easter eggs). Francine quits in disgust and prepares to sail to South America and marry Señor Rodriguez. Despite his lawyer's advice to flee to another state, Gar insists on taking full responsibility.

Just as all seems lost, Banks offers to reimburse all the shareholders and pay Gar enough to make a $100,000 profit just to be rid of the whole mess (and restore natural rubber stock prices). Gar rushes to the dock to retrieve the Golden Gate controlling shares, which he had signed over to Francine. While there, he wins her back by promising to give up promoting, only to have Donahey show up with a scheme for Alaskan gold/marble/spruce wood. Within seconds, Gar is plotting his next campaign.

Cast
 William Powell as Gar Evans
 Evelyn Brent as Francine Dale
 George Sidney  as Ginsburg
 John Wray as Jimmy Moore, Gar's lawyer
 Evalyn Knapp as Helen Wilson
 Guy Kibbee as Clifford Gray
 Frank McHugh as Mike Donahey
 Oscar Apfel as Mr. Hackett, from the Better Business Bureau
 Ben Alexander as Geoffrey Weston, Helen's jealous boyfriend
 Harold Waldrige as Gus Vanderbilt, hired solely for his impressive last name
 Charles Middleton as Mr. Banks
 Harry Beresford as Dr. Rudolph Pfeiffer
 André Luguet as Senor Rodriguez, Francine's South American fiance

Reception
In his New York Times review, Mordaunt Hall described High Pressure as "a brightly written and constantly amusing film". Hall noted that "William Powell is in his element" and "is an excellent type for this tale." Sidney and Kibbee were also praised for their performances.

References

Further reading

External links

1932 films
1932 comedy films
1930s business films
American business films
American comedy films
American black-and-white films
American films based on plays
Films directed by Mervyn LeRoy
Warner Bros. films
1930s English-language films
1930s American films